The Brummie dialect, or more formally the Birmingham dialect, is spoken by many people in Birmingham, England, and some of its surrounding areas. "Brummie" is also a demonym for people from Birmingham. It is often erroneously used in referring to all accents of the West Midlands, as it is markedly distinct from the traditional accent of the adjacent Black Country, but modern-day population mobility has tended to blur the distinction. For instance, Dudley-born comedian Lenny Henry, Walsall-born rock musician Noddy Holder, Smethwick-reared actress Julie Walters, Wollaston-born soap actress Jan Pearson, Solihull-born motoring journalist and TV presenter Richard Hammond, and West Bromwich-born comedian Frank Skinner are sometimes mistaken for Brummie-speakers by people outside the West Midlands county.

Additionally, population mobility has meant that to a degree, the Brummie accent extends into some parts of the Metropolitan Borough of Solihull, but much of the accent within the borough might be considered to be closer to contemporary RP. For example, Solihull-born presenter Richard Hammond (despite often being referred to as a Brummie) does not speak with a strong Brummie accent but is identifiably from the West Midlands.

The Brummie accent and the Coventry accent are also quite distinct in their differences, despite only  separating the cities. To the untrained ear, however, all of these accents may sound very similar, just as British English speakers may find it hard to distinguish between different Canadian and American accents or Australian and New Zealand accents.

Name
The term Brummie derives from Brummagem or Bromwichham, which are historical variants of the name Birmingham.

Accent
The strength of a person's accent varies greatly all across Birmingham. As with most cities, the accent changes relative to the area of the city. A common misconception is that everyone in Birmingham speaks the same accent. It could be argued Brummie is an accent rather than a dialect as in Black Country, which is a dialect with unique words and phrases, as in "owamya?" for how are you, which many comment is not used in Brummie speech. Similarly, Brummies pronounce I as 'oy' whereas Black Country uses the dialect 'Ah' as in 'Ah bin' meaning I have been.

 has said that the accent is "a dialectal hybrid of northern, southern, Midlands, Warwickshire, Staffordshire and Worcestershire speech", also with elements from the languages and dialects of its Asian and Afro-Caribbean communities.

There are also differences between Brummie and Black Country accents, which are not readily apparent to people from outside the West Midlands. A Black Country accent and a Birmingham accent can be hard to distinguish if neither accent is that broad. Phonetician John Wells has admitted that he cannot tell any difference between the accents.

Rhymes and vocabulary in the works of William Shakespeare suggest that he used a local dialect, with many historians and scholars arguing that Shakespeare used a Stratford-upon-Avon, Brummie, Cotswold, Warwickshire or other Midlands dialect in his work. However, the veracity of this assertion is not accepted by all historians, and his accent would certainly have been entirely distinct from any modern English accent, including any modern Midlands accent.

Stereotypes
He alleges that overseas visitors, in contrast, find it "lilting and melodious", and from this claims that such dislike is driven by various linguistic myths and social factors peculiar to the UK ("social snobbery, negative media stereotyping, the poor public image of the City of Birmingham, and the north/south geographical and linguistic divide").

For instance, despite the city's cultural and innovative history, its industrial background (as depicted by the arm-and-hammer in Birmingham's coat of arms) has led to a muscular and unintelligent stereotype: a "Brummagem screwdriver" is UK slang for a hammer.

Thorne also cites the mass media and entertainment industry where actors, usually non-Birmingham, have used inaccurate accents and/or portrayed negative roles.

Advertisements are another medium where many perceive stereotypes. Journalist Lydia Stockdale, writing in the Birmingham Post, commented on advertisers' association of Birmingham accents with pigs: the pig in the ad for Colman's Potato Bakes, Nick Park's Hells Angel Pigs for British Gas, the puppet simply known as Pig from Pipkins and ITV's "Dave the window-cleaner pig" all had Brummie accents. In 2003, a Halifax bank advertisement featuring Howard Brown, a Birmingham- born and based employee, was replaced by an animated version with an exaggerated comical accent overdubbed by a Cockney actor.

Pronunciation

*In Brummie, some SQUARE words shift to the set of NEAR such as there and where, thus pronounced as /ðɪə/ and /wɪə/ insted of /ðɛə/ and /wɛə/ respectively. 

Urszula Clark has proposed the FACE vowel as a difference between Birmingham and Black Country pronunciation, with Birmingham speakers' using /ʌɪ/ and Black Country speakers' using /æɪ/. She also mentions that Black Country speakers are more likely to use /ɪʊ/ where most other accents use /juː/ (in words such as new, Hugh, stew, etc.). This /ɪʊ/ is also present in some North American dialects for words like eww, grew, new due, etc., contrasting with /u/ (words like boo, zoo, to, too, moon, dune etc.). Other North American dialects may use /ju/ for this purpose, or even make no distinction at all.

Below are some common features of a recognisable Brummie accent (a given speaker may not necessarily use all, or use a feature consistently). The letters enclosed in square bracketsuse the International Phonetic Alphabet. The corresponding example words in italics are spelt so that a reader using Received Pronunciation (RP) can approximate the sounds.

 The vowel of mouth (RP ) can be  or 
 The letters ng often represent  where RP has just  (e.g. singer as ). See "ng"-coalescence
 Both the vowels of strut and foot are pronounced , as in northern England In Birmingham, STRUT and FOOT may either be distinguished or merge. See foot–strut split
 The majority of Brummies use the Northern  in words like bath, cast and chance, although the South-Eastern  is more common amongst older speakers.
 The vowels in price and choice may be almost merged as  so that the two words would almost rhyme. However, the two are still distinct, unlike in the Black Country dialect.
 In more old-fashioned Brummie accents, the FORCE set of words takes  and the PURE set takes , so both sets were in two syllables in broad transcription.
 Final unstressed  may be realised as 
 In a few cases, voicing of final  (e.g. bus as )
 Some tapping of prevocalic  (some speakers; e.g. in crime or there is)

Recordings of Brummie speakers with phonetic features described in SAMPA format can be found at the Collect Britain dialects site.

Lexicon
According to the PhD thesis of Steve Thorne at the University of Birmingham Department of English, Birmingham English is "a dialectal hybrid of northern, southern, Midlands, Warwickshire, Staffordshire and Worcestershire speech", also with elements from the languages and dialects of its Asian and Afro-Caribbean communities.

Traditional expressions include:

 Babby  variation of "baby"
 Bab  variation of "babe"
 Bawlin, bawl  to weep, as in "She started to bawl" (not unique to Birmingham, common in other parts of England, Australia and South Africa)
 Bottler  a popular and enjoyable song
 Blart  to weep / cry
 Cob  a crusty bread roll (comes from the fact that bread rolls look like street cobbles and may be as hard as one; soft bread rolls are known as rolls or baps)
 Each  everyone (as in "Good evening each")
 Fock  a milder and more nuanced version of the swear word fuck
 Gambol  a West Midlands term for a forward roll
 Go and play up your own end  said to children from a different street making a nuisance. It has been used as the title of the autobiographical book and musical play about the Birmingham childhood of radio presenter and entertainer Malcolm Stent
 Mom  the common variation of the word "Mum" (also common in the United States, South Africa and elsewhere)
 Our kid  used to refer to siblings (as in "Our kid fell off his bike.") Also commonly used in the north of England.
 Our wench  affectionate term, meaning 'sister' or sometimes used by a husband referring to his wife; derived from the older 16th and 17th meaning of "woman"
 The outdoor  exclusive West Midlands term for off-licence
 Pop  another word for a carbonated drink, e.g. "Do you want a glass of pop?". (common in other parts of England)
 Snap  food, a meal, allegedly derived from the act of eating itself (example usage "I'm off to get my snap" equates to "I'm leaving to get my dinner"). May also refer to the tin containing lunch, a "snap tin", as taken down the pit by miners
 Scrage a scratched cut, where skin is sliced off. For example, "I fell over and badly scraged my knee"
 Suff  another word for drain, as in "put it down the suff"
 Throw a wobbly  to become sulky or have a tantrum (not unique to Birmingham, common in England, Australia and South Africa)
 Trap  to leave suddenly, or flee
 Up the cut  up the canal (not unique to Birmingham)
 Yampy  mad, daft, barmy. Many from Black Country believe yampy originates from their region, from the Dudley-Tipton area, which has been appropriated and claimed as their own by both Birmingham and Coventry dialects. However, the word is found in areas of the Black Country, both outside Birmingham and Tipton/Dudley which therefore might have been a general term used in south Staffordshire and north Worcestershire areas.

Notable speakers

Examples of speakers include TV presenter Adrian Chiles, singer/musician Christine McVie, comedian Jasper Carrott, Goodies actor and TV presenter Bill Oddie, hip-hop and garage musician Mike Skinner, rock musicians Ozzy Osbourne, Tony Iommi, Geezer Butler, Bill Ward (all members of the original Black Sabbath), Roy Wood, Jeff Lynne (ELO founders), Rob Halford (Judas Priest), Dave Pegg (of Fairport Convention and Jethro Tull), broadcaster Les Ross, politicians Clare Short and Jess Phillips, SAS soldier and author John "Brummie" Stokes, TV presenter Alison Hammond, internet meme Danny G, and many actresses and actors including Martha Howe-Douglas, Donnaleigh Bailey, Nicolas Woodman, Julie Walters, Cat Deeley, Sarah Smart, Felicity Jones, John Oliver and Ryan Cartwright.

See also
 Black Country dialect
 Potteries dialect (North Staffordshire)

References

Bibliography

External links
 Talk Like A Brummie A wiki-based Birmingham dialect dictionary
 ebrummie.co.uk Dr Steve Thorne's website devoted to the study of Brummie, including a dictionary, MP3 speech samples, discussion of his research on stereotypes, etc.
 Birmingham English sample using a test paragraph including most English sounds: George Mason University Speech Accent Archive. Compare a Dudley (Black Country) sample
 Sounds Familiar? Listen to examples of regional accents and dialects from across the UK on the British Library's 'Sounds Familiar' website
 Why Brummies Why not Birmies? Etymological article by Dr Carl Chinn
 Paul Henry on Benny's accent Noele Gordon and Crossroads Appreciation Society interview
 English Accents and Dialects, British Library : Sue Long, Aubrey Walton, Harry Phillips and Billy Lucas.

Culture in Birmingham, West Midlands
English language in England
Languages of the United Kingdom
Brummie
British regional nicknames
City colloquials